Vedanta Desikan (1268–1369), also rendered Vedanta Desikar, Swami Vedanta Desikan, and Thoopul Nigamaantha Desikan, was an Indian polymath who wrote philosophical as well as religious and poetical works in several languages, including Sanskrit, Manipravaḷam (a Sanskritised form of literary Tamil), Tamil and Prakrit. He was an Indian philosopher, Sri Vaishnava guru, and one of the most brilliant stalwarts of Sri Vaishnavism in the post-Ramanuja period. He was a Hindu devotee, poet, Master of Acharyas (desikan) and a logician and mathematician. He was the disciple of Kidambi Appullar, also known as Athreya Ramanujachariar, who himself was of a master-disciple lineage that began with Ramanuja. Vedanta Desikan is considered to be avatar (incarnation) of the divine bell of Venkateshvara of Tirumala by the Vadakalai sect of Sri Vaishnavism. Vedanta Desikan belongs to Vishwamitra/Kaushika gotra.

On the occasion of 750th anniversary of the life of Vedanta Desikan, the Indian postal department unveiled a stamp to commemorate the great philosopher's life and highly valued works. The stamp was unveiled by Venkaiah Naidu, Vice President of India in May 2019.

Early life 
Desikan was born in the year 1268 CE, to a pious couple named Ananta Suri and Totaramba, who named him ‘Venkatanathan’. When he was five, his maternal uncle, Kidambi Appullar, took him to attend a spiritual discourse of Nadadhoor Ammal, a revered Sri Vaishnava scholar of that time. As soon as Ammal saw the divine radiance of the child, he stopped his discourse, and hugged Venkatanathan affectionately.

When Ammal told the audience that he had forgotten where he had stopped his discourse, it was Venkatanathan who reminded him immediately, to the astonishment of the assembled scholars. Deeply impressed, Ammal blessed him and predicted that Venkatanathan would become the main torch-bearer for Sri Vaishnavism.

When Desikar turned seven, Kidambi Appullar accepted Venkatanaathan as his disciple, and taught him arts, sciences and scriptures. By the age of 20, Desikar became famous for his mastery over poetry, logic, linguistics, science, Vedanta, debate, and allied arts. 

Even though Desikar was multi-faceted and famous, he lived a humble and simple life with the support of his wife, Thirumangai. He undertook a vow called uchhavritti, whereby he depended wholly on the Supreme Lord for his household needs by accepting grains and vegetables donated by disciples voluntarily, without actively seeking it.

Desikar stayed in several cities and towns through his life such as Thiruvaheendrapuram, Kanchipuram, Srirangam, Sathyagala, and Melkote. He also travelled widely all over India on foot. There exist several anecdotes regarding the life of Desikan furnished by his followers.

Literary works 
Desikan composed many different works in languages such as Tamil, Sanskrit, Prakrit, and Manipravalam (a mixture of Sanskrit and Tamil)

He composed over a hundred works in the following genre:

• 28 devotional poems in Sanskrit such as the Hayagriva-stotram, Kamasika-ashthakam and Gopala-vimshati

• 24 devotional poems and treatises in Tamil  such as Gitartha-sangraham and Charama-sloka-churkku

• 11 philosophical treatises such as Shata-dushani,  Mimamsa-paduka and Tattva-Mukta-kalapam

• 10 commentaries on the works of previous acharyas such as Stotra-Ratna-bhashya, Chatus-shloki-bhashya and Tatparya-Chandrika

• 5 narrative poems such as his magnum opus, the Paduka-sahasram, and the epic poem  called Yadavabhyudaya which rivals the decorative poetry of Mahakavi Kalidasa's works, and the Hamsa-sandesha

• 32 esoteric texts revealing the hidden meanings of prappati-marga such as Srimad Rahasya-traya-saram, Paramapada-sopanam, Amrita-ranjani and Amrita-svadhini

• 1 drama named Sankalpa-suryodayam

• 13 works on arts and sciences such as Bhugola-nirnayam and Silpartha-saram

• 4 works that codified religious rites and practices such as Sri-Vaishnava-dinasari and Bhagavad-aradhana-vidhi

Desikan composed his poems in various poetic metres. Vedic literature is written in the form of hymns set rhythmically to different metres, called ‘chandas’. Each metre is governed by the number of syllables specific to it. Poets are expected to conform to these norms in their compositions. Desikan has employed  22 metres in the 862 verses he composed on presiding deities of various temples in India. The following are some of the compositions of Vedanta Desikan that provide a glimpse of his mastery over poetry, logic, grammar and philosophy:

Hayagriva Stotram: a hymn on Hayagriva, the God of Learning, who bestows real knowledge to the reciter, banishing the darkness of ignorance from within him.

Abheethistavam: a prayer to Ranganatha for relief from different types of fear, ultimately seeking and being bestowed refuge at the lotus feet of God

Achyutha Satakam: a hundred verses in praise of Devanatha, in which Desikan expresses his passionate love in the form of a bride

Bhagavat Dhyana Sopanam:  twelve stanzas that describe the steps for meditating upon the deity of Srirangam, Ranganathaswamy

Dasavatara Stotram: describes the ten important incarnations of God to protect the world and uphold the principles of dharma or righteousness

Daya Satakam: a hundred verses eulogising the mercy or daya of the deity of Tirumala. The work is divided into 10 decads, each portraying different qualities of the personified mother, Dayadevi. It commences with the short anushtab metre. Each successive decad employs a more complex metre, till it culminates in decorative poetry

Garuda Dandakam: A complex stotram composed in the Dandakam meter style, and has 108 aksharas in every padam. It is believed that Desikan composed it when a snake charmer challenged him to summon the mighty Garuda.

Sri Stuti: a prayer to Sridevi, the Goddess of Fortune that is said to have been composed when a bachelor was sent to Desikan, seeking financial help for his marriage. Since Desikan himself lived a life of voluntary poverty, he took him to the temple of the Goddess Perundevi, Kanchipuram and sang Sri Stuti. This culminated in a shower of gold coins, solving the financial problems of the young bachelor.

Sudarshanasthaka: eight verses set in the rare ‘dhritichhandas; metre praising the holy discuss-weapon of Vishnu, wielded by God to protect the virtuous

Kamasikasthaka:  A prayer of eight verses to Narasimha, who assumed a man-lion form to slay the demon Hiranyakashpu, and protect his devotee, Prahlada.

Nyasa sutras: Texts composed by Desikan which extract the essence of the sharanagati doctrine of self-surrender. These are the Nyasa Dasakam, Nyasa Vimsathi and Nyasa Tilakam.

Vairagya panchakam: five verses that describe the importance of renunciation or vairagya. The word ‘dhana’ or wealth, occurs eleven times, each with a different contextual meaning.

Hamsa-sandesha: is a lyric poem of 110 verses, reminiscent of Kalidasa's Meghadhuta. It describes Rama sending a message via a swan to his wife Sita, who was abducted by the rakshshasa king, Ravana.

Yadavabhyudaya: an epic poem of 24 cantos describing the destiny of the Yadava Kings, the dynasty in which Krishna appeared. It is on par with the Kalidasa's work called Raghuvamsa, which describes the dynasty of the Raghu kings, in which Rama appeared.

Paduka Sahasram: a thousand and eight verses spread over 32 divisions called paddhatis, on the holy sandals of the deity Ranganatha. Desikan was challenged by another scholar to compose 1000 verses in a night, and he completed this work in three hours. Verses in one section form pictorial patterns with the arrangements of the letters used.

Tamil works: Vedanta Desikan's Works in Tamil are numerous, out of which two are noteworthy: Paramathabhangam, where he describes and refutes 15 schools of philosophy, and Aharaniyamam, where he describes the correct types food to be consumed by a Vaishnava.

Tributes 

Sri Vaishnava texts record how the goddess Lakshmi, known as Ranganayaki in the holy town of Srirangam, personally conferred on him the title of ‘Sarva-tantra-svatantra’ or master of all arts and crafts. It is also believed that Rangantha who is the presiding deity of Srirangam, awarded the title of ‘Vedanta Desikan’, meaning: the supreme teacher of the conclusion of all knowledge. This was done because God is believed to have been immensely pleased when Desikan debated with differing scholars and established the supremacy of the path of loving surrender, or prapatti-marga.

He received other titles such as ‘Kavitarkika-kesari’ and ‘Kavitarkika-simham’, the lion amongst poets; and ‘Ramanuja-daya-patram’, the recipient of Ramanuja's causeless mercy, given in a laudatory verse composed by the famous Brahma Tantra Svatantra Swami.

In Sri Vaishnavism, a thanian is a laudatory dedication in verse composed about an acharya by another acharya who is the subject's pupil, and someone whom the subject greatly admired. The thanian of Desikan is:

This thanian was composed by brahmatantraswatantra jeeyar of Parakala Mutt on the day of star of Hastham, the star of Varadharaja Perumal of Kanchipuram in the Tamil month of Avani. It is recited before starting Divya Prabandham — the works of Alvars – by Vadakalayars. It translates as "I salute the great Venkata Natha also called Vedanta Acharya and Lion among poets and logicians and who was well adorned by both Knowledge and discretion and who well deserved the grace of Athreya Ramanujar who also had the same name."

A Vaḻi Thirunamam is a set of salutary verses that are chanted in temple, marking the closure of the day's Divya Prabandha Chanting. The salutary verses are sung to ensure that these temples and the practices as established by the acharyas and Ramanuja would be followed forever. Vedanta Desikan's Vaḻi Thirunamam is chanted in most of the Vadakalai Divya Desams all over India.

See also
 List of Sanskrit plays in English translation

References

Further reading

External links 

 

Indian Hindu spiritual teachers
Sri Vaishnava religious leaders
1269 births
13th-century Indian philosophers
14th-century Indian philosophers
Medieval Hindu religious leaders
1369 deaths
14th-century Indian mathematicians